Marie Wieck (January 17, 1832 – November 2, 1916) was a German pianist, singer, piano teacher, and composer. She was the daughter of renowned piano teacher Friedrich Wieck and the younger half-sister of Clara Schumann who was 12 years older.

Early life and education
Marie was born in Leipzig to Friedrich Wieck and his second wife Clementine Fechner. Her mother was a sister of painter Eduard Clemens Fechner and of experimental psychology pioneer Gustav Fechner. She was trained from an early age in piano and voice by her father Friedrich. Marie's first public appearance was in 1842, when she and her half-sister Clara performed at a concert in Dresden. She later performed with her father at the Gewandhaus in Leipzig.

Musical career
An eminent singer and pianist, Wieck sang in concerts with her half-sister Clara and also performed with Joseph Joachim's wife, the opera singer Amalie Schneeweiss. She was appointed court pianist for the chamber concerts of the Prince of Hohenzollern.

Wieck composed and published several piano works, including Études for piano and studies for voice. She is credited for working to bring German music to the attention of the public, particularly in London, where she performed publicly for five seasons. Wieck never married.

References

1832 births
1916 deaths
19th-century German women singers
19th-century women composers
20th-century German women singers
20th-century women composers
Women classical composers
German women classical composers
German Romantic composers
Musicians from Leipzig